Olivia Wensley (born 25 April 1985) is a former lawyer and New Zealand #MeToo advocate. She has worked for Startup Queenstown Lakes on a part-time basis and had been with the organisation as chief executive from 2020-22. Wensley says she has inspired hundreds to share their sexual harassment stories and has been credited for making important efforts in highlighting the working conditions and harassment young practitioners can face as lawyers in New Zealand.

Biography 
Wensley studied law at the University of Canterbury and the University of Waikato, and worked as a lawyer in New Zealand, Australia and Singapore.

On 28 February 2018, Wensley published a piece on LinkedIn titled We Need to Talk About Law's Dirty Little Secret, which was re-published by media outlet Stuff. The article described sexual harassment Wensley had experienced at law firms; it quickly went viral and attracted international media attention. In speaking out, Wensley helped uncover other women's stories of rape, assault and harassment in the legal profession.

Wensley has been a vocal critic of the New Zealand Law Society's handling of the Russell McVeagh scandal, where it has been alleged that multiple interns were sexually assaulted and harassed during the summer of 2016/2017 – causing national outrage. Wensley has called for stronger sanctions against sexual offenders in the legal profession.

In March 2018, Wensley was one of many stakeholders to meet with the New Zealand Minister of Justice, Andrew Little who reconfirmed his commitment to holding the legal profession to account over sexual harassment and bullying in the workplace.

Wensley was one of 488 nominees for 2019 New Zealander of the Year.

Political career 
Wensley contested the mayor of Queenstown-Lakes position in the 2022 New Zealand local elections. Wensley placed third, receiving 2,531 of 12,272 votes cast.

Wensley's personal business interests in property development and her father-in-law's involvement in New Zealand's leaky home crisis was a feature of mayoralty race, especially when a proposed rates-rise was linked to her father-in-law. Opposing candidates Glyn Lewers and Jon Mitchell said that Wensley would have to recuse herself from key council decisions if she were to be elected because of conflicts of interest stemming from these matters. During the election campaign Wensley denied these claims and stated her intention to sue those who made them for defamation, but after the election said it was "not worth the energy."

References 

1985 births
Living people
21st-century New Zealand lawyers
New Zealand women lawyers
University of Canterbury alumni
University of Waikato alumni
New Zealand women's rights activists
New Zealand women chief executives
New Zealand political candidates